Pseudobizionia is a Gram-negative, aerobic and non-motile genus of bacteria from the family of Flavobacteriaceae with one known species (Pseudobizionia ponticola). Pseudobizionia ponticola has been isolated from seawater from the Yellow Sea.

References

Flavobacteria
Bacteria genera
Monotypic bacteria genera
Taxa described in 2018